Thomas Albert Handley (24 December 1885 – 15 January 1948) was an Australian rules footballer who played with St Kilda in the Victorian Football League (VFL).

Notes

External links 

1885 births
1948 deaths
Australian rules footballers from Melbourne
St Kilda Football Club players